Leda Mileva (Bulgarian: Леда Милева) (5 February 1920 – 5 February 2013) was a Bulgarian communist, writer, translator and diplomat. She was the daughter of Bulgarian poet Geo Milev.

Mileva was ambassador and resident representative of Bulgaria in UNESCO until 1978.

References
Фактор - Леда Милева откраднала идеята за Зайченцето Бяло от поетесата Веса Паспалеева

Bulgarian women writers
Bulgarian translators
Bulgarian women diplomats
Sofia University alumni
2013 deaths
1920 births
20th-century translators
20th-century women writers
Bulgarian women ambassadors
Permanent Delegates of Bulgaria to UNESCO